St. Gabriel College is a private Catholic primary and secondary school, located in Quito, Ecuador. The school was founded by the Society of Jesus in 1862, and has grown to include pre-primary as well as six primary and six secondary years.

History 
In 1862 President Gabriel García Moreno brought the Jesuits to Ecuador and restored to them the National School in Quito, which they had run in colonial times under the name San Luis, in the heart of old Quito. They renamed the school San Gabriel. It was still subsidized by the state, until 1901 when the liberal government forced its privatization. In 1958 it moved to its new facilities on America Avenue in the north of the city. In 2011, San Gabriel opened a coeducational primary unit, beginning with the first grade.

Notable staff

 Fabián Alarcón
 Francisco Tobar García
 José María Velasco Ibarra
 Jorge Salvador Lara
 Jamil Mahuad
 Jaime Nebot
 Fausto Oswaldo Sarmiento - environmentalist
 Clemente Yerovi

See also

 Catholic Church in Ecuador
 Education in Ecuador
 List of Jesuit schools

References  

Jesuit secondary schools in Ecuador
Educational institutions established in 1862
Secondary schools in Quito
Private schools in Ecuador
Jesuit primary schools in Ecuador
1862 establishments in Ecuador